Hasan Kuruçay (born 31 August 1997) is a professional footballer who plays as a centre-back for Eintracht Braunschweig. Born in Denmark, he has represented Turkey at youth level.

Club career
Born in Odense, Denmark, Kuruçay started his career with OB. He signed for Norwegian side Florø in February 2019, before moving to Strømmen in February 2020. In January 2021, he joined HamKam on a two-year contract. On 2 April 2022, he made his Eliteserien debut in a 2–2 draw against Lillestrøm.

On 24 January 2023, Kuruçay joined German 2. Bundesliga club Eintracht Braunschweig on a deal until June 2024.

International career
Kuruçay has represented Turkey at youth international level.

References

External links

1997 births
Living people
Danish people of Turkish descent
Danish men's footballers
Footballers from Odense
Association football defenders
Turkish footballers
Danish 1st Division players
Norwegian Second Division players
Norwegian First Division players
Eliteserien players
2. Bundesliga players
Odense Boldklub players
Næstved Boldklub players
BK Marienlyst players
Florø SK players
Strømmen IF players
Hamarkameratene players
Eintracht Braunschweig players
Danish expatriate men's footballers
Turkish expatriate footballers
Danish expatriate sportspeople in Norway
Turkish expatriate sportspeople in Norway
Expatriate footballers in Norway
Danish expatriate sportspeople in Germany
Turkish expatriate sportspeople in Germany
Expatriate footballers in Germany